Zubeen Garg (born 18 November 1972), his contributions are mostly attributed in Assamese, Bengali and Hindi films and music. Garg has recorded more than 35,000 songs in 40 different languages in the past 30 years. He records more than 600 songs every year and has recorded 36 songs in a night.

Hindi film & webseries songs

Film songs

Webseries songs

Hindi album & single songs

Album songs

Singles

Hindi replaced & unreleased songs

Replaced songs

Unreleased songs

Bengali film songs

Bengali non-film songs

Album songs

Single songs

Assamese film & VCD songs

Assamese album & theater songs

Album songs

Theatre songs

Assamese television & single songs

Television songs

Singles

Telugu songs

Kannada songs

Tamil songs

Sindhi songs

Malayalam songs

Odia songs

Punjabi songs

Bhojpuri Songs

Marathi songs

Bodo songs

Karbi songs

 Inglong Amensopi

Tiwa songs

Nepali songs

Bishnupriya Manipuri songs

Adi songs

Nyishi songs

Galo songs

See also
 Zubeen Garg discography

References

External links
 Zubeen Garg on Facebook

Lists of songs recorded by Indian singers